Fourth-seeded pair Richey Reneberg and Christo van Rensburg won the title, defeating Brian MacPhie and David Witt in the final.

Seeds
Champion seeds are indicated in bold text while text in italics indicates the round in which those seeds were eliminated.

  Jared Palmer /  Todd Woodbridge (semifinals)
  Doug Flach /  Ken Flach (first round)
  Brian Devening /  Bryan Shelton (quarterfinals)
  Richey Reneberg /  Christo van Rensburg (champions)

Draw

References

1994 U.S. Men's Clay Court Championships